The Tabula Capuana ("Tablet from Capua"; Ital. Tavola Capuana), is an ancient terracotta slab, with a long inscribed text in Etruscan, dated to about 470 bce, apparently a ritual calendar. About 390 words are legible, making it the second-most extensive surviving Etruscan text. (The longest is the linen book (Liber Linteus), also a ritual calendar, used in ancient Egypt for mummy wrappings, now at Zagreb.) It is located in the Altes Museum, Berlin.

Description

Horizontal scribed lines divide the text into ten sections. The writing is most similar to that used in Campania in the mid 5th century BC, though surely  the text being transcribed is much older. The text is boustrophedon, with the first line to be read left to right, the next right to left, etc.

Attempts at deciphering the text (Mauro Cristofani, 1995) are most generally based on the supposition that it prescribes certain rites on certain days of the year at certain places for certain deities. The text itself was edited by Francesco Roncalli, in Scrivere etrusco 1985.

Recently, a major scholar in the field, Bouke van der Meer has proposed a "very tentative partial word-for-word translation" of the text:

Text example
(/ indicates line break; some word breaks are uncertain)

First section (lines 1-7): MARCH?
The first legible section likely is devoted to rituals to be held in March (though the Etruscan word for this month, Velcitna, does not occur in the legible text, presumably because it was in the missing parts).

There are three to five initial lines missing and then 30-50 characters missing in the initial damaged lines shown here.

  ...vacil.../2ai savcnes satiriasa.../3...[nunθ?]eri θuθcu 
  vacil  śipir  śuri leθamsul 
 ci tartiria /4 cim cleva 
acasri halχtei 
  vacil iceu  śuni savlasie...
(~5-8 characters broken off at the end of this line)
  /5[mul]uri zile picasri 
savlasieis
  vacil lunaśie vaca iχnac 
fuli/6nuśnes 
  vacil savcnes itna 
  muluri zile picasri 
iane
  vacil l/7eθamsul scuvune 
marzac saca⋮

Notes: 
In line 1 and throughout, vacil may mean "libation" (or some similar rite or ceremony), in which case each of the first phrases beginning with it presumably indicate what deity to pour a libation to and perhaps other information. However, Steinbauer (agreeing with Rix) has challenged this assumptions and, considering that it seems to be positioned at the beginning of a series of phrases within the contexts of a step-by-step instruction, proposed that vacil (with its variants vacal and vacl) simply means "then."

In line 2, savc-nes according to van der Meer is an Apolline god, perhaps related in form to saucsaθ at 3.15 of the Liber Linteus. The form in the Liber Linteus, preceded as here by the term vacl "libation," also falls in a section that probably deals with March, though as here there is no explicit mention of a month name.

Note that the ending -nes/-nis also occurs in the forms fulinuś-nes (5-6) and caθ-nis (9), all referring to deities.

In line 2, satiriasa (if one word) may be a form of Satre the Etruscan term for Saturn, which also appears on the Piacenza Liver among chthonic deities. Or it could be in some way connected to or contrasting with tartiria at the end of line 3.

In line three, śuri is a (not necessarily exclusively) chthonic deity.Leθam-s appears on the Piacenza Liver among chthonic deities, but may have other connections as well. The genitive is used here as usual for indirect object.

In lines three and four, ci(m) means "three," and both tartiria and cleva indicate kinds of offerings, yielding a possible partial translation: "To Lethams, three tartiria (perhaps related to Greek Tartaros, as if '(gifts) for the underworld'?) offerings and three cleva offerings ..." In line 4, halχ- is likely the name of a kind of vase.
 
A verbal form of vacil may be seen in line 5: vac-a "make a libation (to)?"; But van der Meer reads faca here, with unknown meaning. A similar form, vac-i is in line 28, also preceding a form of  fuli/nuśnes. Also in line 5, lunaśie brings to mind the Roman moon goddess, Luna (which some equate with Cath, see below).

pi-cas(ri) (5,6) is defined by Pallottino as a verb of offering, to be compared with a-cas "to do; to offer."   mulu- (4/5, 6) and scu- (7, 10) seem to be roots meaning "to offer, give" and "finish", respectively; and sac- means "carry out a sacred act; consecrate." In lines 5 - 6,  fuli/nuśnes may be a form of Fufluns, the Etruscan Dionysus who is associated with the Etruscan goddess Caθa who also seems to be mentioned in this text (see below). A somewhat similar form, fuln[folnius] can be found on line 29 of the Tabula Cortonensis.

Note the frequent repetitions (besides vacil): savcnes(2,6); leθamsul(3, 6/7, 8...); mulu-ri zile picas-ri(4/5,6); savlasie(is)(4, 5); scu-vune marza(c)(7) versus marza...scuvse(10)...

Start of second section (starting on line 8): APRIL = apirase
The second section seems to be devoted to rituals to be held in April.

 iśvei tule ilucve apirase 
 leθamsul ilucu cuiesχu perpri  
 cipen apires /9 racvanies huθ zusle 
 rithnai tul tei 
 snuza in te hamaiθi 
 civeis caθnis fan/10iri 
 marza in te hamaiθi 
 ital sacri 
 utus ecunza 
 iti alχu 
scuvse 
 riθnai tu/11 l tei 
 ci zusle acun siricima nunθeri 
 eθ iśuma zuslevai apire nunθer/12i 
 avθleθ aium
 vacil ia leθamsul nunθeri 
 vacil ia riθnaita 
 eθ aθene/13ica perpri...

Notes: Line 8: isvei occurs frequently in the Liber Linteus where it appears to mean "festival" or "ides". The formtul(e)(8, 9, 10) in some contexts means "stone," perhaps related to tular "border" (< "stone marking a border"?), itself probably related to (or the origin of?) Umbrian tuder "boundary" also the origin of the Umbrian town name Todi. Here it seems to mean "(on or after) the ides (of a particular month)." According to van der Meer, iluc-ve/u (twice in line 8) means "feast." Of course, iśvei and tule can't both mean "ides," and in any case, the Latin ides originally fell on the full moon and was sacred to Jupiter, but since the deities recognizable here are underworld (leθams and caθ), tul may instead refer to the dark phase of the moon, or the new moon (Latin kalends). As van der Meer points out elaborately elsewhere, the contrast between light and dark gods was very important for the Etruscan calendar and for how they divided up the heavens.

apirase may mean "(in the) month of April." See above for Leθam-sul. Van der Meer translates pep-ri as "must be held." cipen seems to be a priestly title (with variants cepa(r), cepe(n)).

huθ in line 9 means "six,"  and ci in line 11 means "three." zusle(-vai) (9, 11) means "sacrificial victims" perhaps specifically "piglets." 

At the end of line 9, caθ-nis may be a form of  Catha, an Etruscan goddess, with an ending -nis/-nes also seen above in other theonymns: savc-nes (lines 2 and 6) and fuli/nuś-nes (lines 5-6). Rarely depicted in art, she is number 8 (among celestial gods) and number 23 on the Piacenza Liver.

sacri (10) is certainly connected to  words meaning "sacred; victim for sacrifice"—Latin sacer, Umbrian sacra sakra, Oscan sakri-, and to 'saca' in line 7 above.

nunθe-ri (11 twice) seems to be a verb "invoke" or "offer," with the necessitive ending -ri also seen in pep-ri(8), picas-ri(5), mulu-ri(4/5), and perhaps śu-ri(3) and sac-ri(10). eθ (11, 12) means "thus." avθ-leθ (12) may be related to avθa "northwind; eagle."

The word acun in line 11 may be from Greek agon (ἀγών) originally "struggle," which came to be used as a term for festivals involving competitive sports; compare Latin Agonalia festivals in honor of Janus in Rome held in January, March, May and December. Later forms show syncope (loss of word-internal vowels): acn-es-em on the Liber Linteus (10.5)) and acn-s . priumn-es "the agon of Priam" on the left side of the Volterna urn.

Third section (lines 18-20): MAY = an/mpile

 iśvei tule ilucve anp[ili]e laruns ilucu huχ 
 śanti huri alχu esχaθ canulis
 mulu/19ri zile zizri
 inpa ...an acasri
 tiniantule leθamsul ilucu perpri
 śanti arvus/20ta aius nunθeri

Larun, Canuli, Tinia, and Aiu are names of Etruscan gods; huχ may mean "celebrate", alχu "given," esχaθ "bring, place"; arvusta "(produce of the) field"  (compare Umbrian arvam "field"; arvia "fruits of the field, grain"). Other words have either already been defined above or are of uncertain meaning.

Discovery
The tablet was uncovered in 1898 in the burial ground of Santa Maria Capua Vetere.

References

Sources
Cristofani, M. Tabula Capuana: Un calendario festivo di età arcaica (Firenze 1995).
van der Meer, L. B. "Some comments on the Tabula Capuana", in: Studi Etruschi 77, 2014 [2015], 149-175.

External links
Basic information, adopted for this entry; photograph (Italian)
Curtun (Modern Cortona)
Full Etruscan text and proposed translation into Italian 

5th-century BC works
1898 archaeological discoveries
Clay tablets
Etruscan artefacts
Etruscan ceramics
Etruscan inscriptions
Capua (ancient city)
Archaeological discoveries in Italy